Amara colvillensis is a species of beetle of the genus Amara in the family Carabidae.

References

colvillensis
Beetles described in 1968